Blind Man With a Pistol is a 1969 fiction novel by Chester Himes. It is the 8th book in the Harlem Cycle series.

Synopsis 

It is summertime in the city of Harlem and Coffin Ed Johnson and Grave Digger Jones are both trying to keep peace in the city. They pursue two different cases in an attempt to keep the city from tearing itself apart.

Sources 
 Blind Man With a Pistol. Google Books. Retrieved 2/26/2014. 
 Blind Man With a Pistol. Goodreads. Retrieved 2/26/2014.

Novels set in Manhattan
Harlem in fiction
Novels by Chester Himes
1969 American novels
American detective novels
African-American novels